Livistona saribus, also known as taraw palm in English, is a species of palm tree found in tropical Southeast Asia.

Common names
One of the vernacular names in the Cambodian language is triëk. In Malay it is known as serdang, or sar in the state of Trengganu. The specific epithet saribus comes from a local name (for what was probably another palm species) in one of the Maluku languages: sariboe, as recorded by the Dutch.

Description
Livistona saribus produces blue fruits, and is cold hardy to twenty-four degrees Celsius. It has spines along the leaf stems which resemble shark teeth.

Distribution
It has a native distribution stretching through Vietnam, Cambodia, Laos, Thailand, Peninsular Malaysia, Borneo, Java and the Philippines. It is also reportedly naturalized in the Society Islands of French Polynesia and also in the Guangdong and Yunnan regions of China.

It is widespread throughout Malaysia, but is rare in western Peninsular Malaysia, being found only in scattered localities on low hills. In the east, however, it forms extensive forests on the coastal hills in the state of Trengganu, and inland in the state of Pahang, as far south as to the Johore border.

Ecology
It grows in dense, closed, disturbed secondary forests.

Uses
In this country the leaves are used for thatch on huts and to make hats.

References

External links
 Palm and Cycad Societies of Australia: Livistona saribus 

saribus
Trees of Indo-China
Trees of Malesia
Trees of China